The 2002–03 Vermont Catamounts men's basketball team represented the University of Vermont during the 2002–03 NCAA Division I men's basketball season. The Catamounts, led by head coach Tom Brennan – coaching in his 17th season, played their home games at Patrick Gym and were members of the America East Conference. They finished the season 21–12, 11–5 in America East play to finish second in the conference regular season standings. They followed that success by winning the America East tournament to earn an automatic bid to the NCAA tournament. Playing as the No. 16 seed in the West region, the Catamounts were defeated by No. 1 seed Arizona in the opening round.

This marked the first of three straight seasons the Catamounts played in the NCAA Tournament.

Roster

Schedule and results

|-
!colspan=9 style=| Regular season

|-
!colspan=9 style=| America East tournament

|-
!colspan=9 style=| NCAA Tournament

Awards and honors
Taylor Coppenrath – America East Player of the Year

References

Vermont Catamounts men's basketball seasons
Vermont
Vermont
Cat
Cat